Winston County is the name of two counties in the United States:

 Winston County, Alabama
 Winston County, Mississippi